Suck It and See is the fourth studio album by English rock band Arctic Monkeys, released on 6 June 2011 by Domino Recording Company. It was produced by the band's longtime collaborator James Ford and was recorded at Sound City Studios in Los Angeles in early 2011, using mostly live takes opposed to overdubbing.

Musically, Suck It and See represents a departure for the band following the darker sound of its predecessor Humbug (2009), instead featuring guitar pop and psychedelic pop. The album's title, a British phrase meaning "give it a try", was viewed as provocative in the United States and subsequently censored in some locations.

Upon release, the album was promoted with various singles and topped the UK Albums Chart and has been certified platinum in the country. The album received generally positive reviews from music critics, with many calling it an improvement over its predecessor. Critics generally complimented the band's style shift, although opinion varied on Turner's lyrics.

Recording and production
Arctic Monkeys wrote the album throughout 2010, with frontman Alex Turner writing the majority of the songs in New York, telling Metro magazine: "I wrote a lot of the new album while I was living in New York and I found myself using more English colloquialisms than ever." Recording took place at Sound City Studios in Los Angeles, California with producer James Ford over five weeks in January–February 2011. Turner has commented that rather than going into the studio with only rough sketches of songs, and making heavy use of overdubbing, the band focused much of their time rehearsing written songs together, coming up with new ideas in the process. Turner stated that the band recorded most of the album live in the studio, "So that meant we could really concentrate on beefing up the guitar sounds."

Suck It and See represents a departure for the band after the darker sound of their previous album Humbug (2009). Speaking to NME shortly before the album's release, drummer Matt Helders promised to deliver a more "instant", "poppy", and "vintage" sound in comparison to Humbug. Featuring a wide variety of styles, commentators have characterised the music as guitar pop, indie rock, indie pop, and psychedelic pop. Consequence of Sound further noted the presence of surf rock and the band's "own interpretation" of glam rock. Q magazine calls the album "the sound of a band drawing back the curtains and letting the sunshine in".

The track "Piledriver Waltz" was first released on Turner's debut EP, Submarine, where it was credited to Turner as a solo artist, featuring Ford on drums. The version included on Suck It and See is a re-recording with the whole band involved.

Artwork and title
According to Turner, the title is "an old Britishism, like a bit Dick Van Dyke-y, like 'give it a try' almost – it'd be a slogan for some candy." He acknowledged that saying "[didn't] really travel very well". The band settled on Suck It and See as the title after debating between titles such as The Rain-Shaped Shimmer Trap, The Thunder-Suckle Fuzz Canyon, The Blond-O-Sonic Rape Alarm, and Thriller, according to a band interview in the NME. In the United States, the title on the cover sleeve was covered by a sticker in certain big-box retailers. In an interview with British radio station XFM, Turner said, "They think it is rude, disrespectful and they're putting a sticker over it in America in certain stores, big ones." The English idiom "suck it and see" means that something must be tried first, appearing, for example, in a 2010 The Economist headline and (as "suck 'em and see") in the advertising slogan of Fisherman's Friend lozenges.

Regarding the artwork, which just features the album title in black over a cream colored background, Turner said, “Once we decided to call the album what it’s called we just decided to go with something very plain and simple. It slowly became apparent that that type of cover was ideal for it. What else would you have otherwise? An image of a person with a lollipop in their mouth? Probably not.” He also said it represented the music, “The cover is the cover because the music is really quite simple. There isn’t any marked level of overdubs on it, and it’s recorded quite basically.”

Release and promotion

On 4 March 2011, the band premièred on its website a new track called "Brick by Brick" with lead vocals by Matt Helders. Helders explained that this is not a single, just a tease of what is coming and that is it is going to be on the upcoming album. The album's title and release date were unveiled six days later on 10 March.

Arctic Monkeys embarked in May 2011 on their Suck It and See Tour. They headlined the Benicàssim Festival 2011 alongside the Strokes, Arcade Fire and Primal Scream. They also headlined Oxegen 2011, Super Bock Super Rock 2011, V Festival 2011, Rock Werchter and T in The Park. They confirmed on 7 February that they were playing two "massive homecoming shows" at the Don Valley Bowl in Sheffield on 10 and 11 June, support included Miles Kane, Anna Calvi, the Vaccines and Dead Sons and Mabel Love, clips from the show were also used in the music video for "The Hellcat Spangled Shalalala". They played at Lollapalooza in Chicago, Illinois from 5–7 August 2011. On 21 August, they also played at Lowlands, the Netherlands. The tour continued until March 2012.

On 13 May, Arctic Monkeys appeared on Later... with Jools Holland and performed four tracks from the album: "Library Pictures", "Don't Sit Down 'Cause I've Moved Your Chair", "Reckless Serenade" and "The Hellcat Spangled Shalalala".

Singles
Four singles were released to promote the album. The lead single, "Don't Sit Down 'Cause I've Moved Your Chair", was released digitally on 12 April 2011, and on 16 April three thousand 7" vinyl copies were released worldwide by the band as part of Record Store Day, backed with "Brick by Brick". It was given a wider release on 30 May 2011, available on 10" vinyl and digital download with backed with "The Blond-O-Sonic Shimmer Trap" and "I.D.S.T.", and on 7" vinyl, backed with "I.D.S.T.".

The second single taken from the album, "The Hellcat Spangled Shalalala", was released on 15 August 2011, backed with a new Death Ramps track featuring Miles Kane, "Little Illusion Machine (Wirral Riddler)". Most of the stock was burned because of the London riots. A limited edition 7" Vinyl of the single was then released over the band's website on 14 August. The song reached No. 15. in Belgium. On 31 October 2011, the title track "Suck It and See" was released as the third single, backed with a new song, "Evil Twin". They performed the song on The Graham Norton Show on 28 October. The fourth and final single, "Black Treacle", was released on 23 January 2012, backed with a second new Death Ramps song, "You & I", featuring Richard Hawley. In March, the band embarked on a North American stadium tour supporting the Black Keys.

Commercial performance
The album has been successful commercially. In its first week of release, the album debuted at number one in the United Kingdom, selling over 82,000 units and knocking Lady Gaga's Born This Way off the top spot. In its second week, the album sold a further 34,910 units in the UK. The album sold 154,000 units in its first week worldwide, selling 333,000 units overall. On 30 May, a week before official release, Domino Records streamed the entire album on SoundCloud. Within a few hours of being made public, the first two tracks had reached over 10,000 listens each, and by the end of the week, each had accrued over 100,000 plays.

Critical reception

Suck It and See received positive reviews from critics, with a 74 rating at Metacritic based on 32 critics.

Jody Rosen of Rolling Stone called the album the band's best since their debut. Stephen Thomas Erlewine of AllMusic stated: "Suck It and See may be at the opposite end of the spectrum from Humbug – it's concentrated and purposeful where its predecessor sprawled – yet it still demands attention from the listener, delivering its rewards according to just how much time you're willing to devote." Although Andrew Perry of The Daily Telegraph felt the record was an improvement over Humbug, he still writes that the album contains "jangling riffs" and "laugh-out-loud lyrics that would make Morrissey proud". Similarly, The Guardians Alexis Petridis also considered Suck It and See to be an improvement over its predecessor, complimenting the band's style shift. Nevertheless, he felt some tracks were not that memorable, while some of Turner's lyrics were below average in comparison to previous efforts. Overall, Petridis calls Suck It and See "the first Arctic Monkeys album that tries to ensnare the listener with its tunes," as opposed to guitar riffs and lyrics, and represents the band becoming "an increasingly well-rounded rock band." Marc Hogan of Pitchfork also gave the album a positive review, calling it the band's "most rewarding" record to date. Unlike other reviewers, Hogan complimented Turner's lyrics, calling them "always keenly-observed", further complimenting the music as "ever-proficient". He overall praised the group's evolution up to that point. In July, the album won Mojo award for the Best Album of 2011. Mojo placed the album at number 39 on its list of "Top 50 albums of 2011."

The album still received some mixed reviews. Evan Rytlewski of The A.V. Club criticised Turner's lyrics as less sly and sophisticated, while also finding the songs themselves to be slower and less memorable than their previous efforts. Kyle Anderson of Entertainment Weekly found that although the album "hits hard", "the boyish energy of their early work is still missed." Dorian Lynksey of The Word was also mixed, stating that "an overload of hyper-chiselled lyricism and a touch too much of yer manly riff-rock." NME named the album cover, an artwork free cream monochrome after the styling of the Beatles' White Album, as one of the worst in history.

Retrospectively, reviewers have typically placed Suck It and See in the middle-low tier in rankings of the band's studio albums. In 2015, NME ranked Suck It and See fourth of the band's five albums up to that point. Lisa Wright writes that the album displayed a variety of styles that "showed a band absolutely in control of what they were doing and one that could bend ideas and genres to fit to their own shape." In 2018, Consequence of Sound ranked Suck It and See fourth of the band's six albums up to that point. Sarah Midkiff states: "While experimental, it's a distillation of their previous works, emerging stylistically confident in their choices." The same year, the album was given the same ranking by the Evening Standard, with Harry Fletcher stating that although the record lacked strong singles and "standout moments", he gave praise to Turner's lyrics, calling them some of his finest up to that point.

Track listing

Personnel
Credits adapted from liner notes.

Arctic Monkeys
 Alex Turner
 Jamie Cook
 Nick O'Malley
 Matt Helders

Additional musicians
 Josh Homme – backing vocals on "All My Own Stunts"

Technical
 James Ford – production
 James Brown – engineering
 Sean Oakley – engineering assistance
 David Covell – engineering assistance
 Craig Silvey – mixing
 Morgan Stratton – mixing assistance
 Bryan Wilson – mixing assistance
 George Marino – mastering

Artwork
 Matthew Cooper – art direction, design
 Jason Evans – art direction, design
 Aaron Brown – photography

Charts

Chart positions

Year-end charts

Certifications

References

External links

2011 albums
Arctic Monkeys albums
Domino Recording Company albums
Warner Records albums
Albums produced by James Ford (musician)
Albums recorded at Sound City Studios